Osborne Morton (born 1945 in Belfast, Northern Ireland) is a former phycologist in the Ulster Museum. Morton resigned in 2007.

Morton was educated in Belfast and at Trinity College, Dublin, where he studied Botany under Professor D.A. Webb. His final year thesis involved research on marine algae, the interest in seaweed having developed from childhood curiosity in the seashore. After graduating from Trinity in 1969, he studied at the University of Wales and obtained a Diploma in Marine Biology. His first post was as an Education Officer in Doncaster Museum. However, the interest in marine algae was actively maintained and he returned to Belfast in 1975 as Research Assistant, later Curator, in Botany with special responsibility for the algae and lichens at the Ulster Museum. His interests include bird-watching, gardening and classical music.

Publications 
Morton, O. 1974. Marine algae of Sandeel Bay, Co. Down. Ir. Nat. J. 18: 32 - 35.

Morton, O. 1976. Marine Algae in Copeland Bird Observatory Report.

Guiry, M.D. and Morton, O. 1976. Schottera nicaeensis (Lamour. ex Duby) Guiry et Hollenberg from Co. Antrim. Ir. Nat. J. 18: 285 - 286.

Morton, O. 1977. A note on W.H.Harvey's algae in the Ulster Museum. Ir. Nat. J. 19: 26.

Morton, O. 1977. Sylvanus Wear's algal collection in the Ulster Museum. Ir. Nat. J. 19: 92 - 93.

Morton, O. 1978. Lemanea in the north of Ireland. Ir. Nat. J. 19: 205.

Morton, O. 1978. Some interesting records of algae from Ireland. Ir. Nat. J. 19: 240 - 242.

McMillan, N.F. and Morton, O. 1979. A Victorian album of algae from the north of Ireland with specimens collected by William Sawers. Ir. Nat. J. 19: 384 - 387.

Morton, O. 1980. Three algal collections in the Ulster Museum herbarium. Ir. Nat. J. 20: 33 - 37.

Morton, O. 1981. American algae collected by W.H.Harvey and others, in the Ulster Museum Herbarium. Taxon 30: 867 - 868.

Guiry, M.D., Irvine, L.M. and Morton, O. 1981. Notes on Irish marine algae - 4. Gymnogongrus devoniensis (Greville) Schotter (Rhodophyta). Ir. Nat. J. 20: 288 - 292.

Morton, O. and Chamberlain, Y.M. 1985. Records of some epiphytic coralline algae in north-east of Ireland. Ir. Nat. J. 21: 436 - 440.

Morton, O. 1988. Lichens on Lighthouse Island. Copeland Bird Observatory Annual Report for 1986.p. 44.

Morton, O. and Chamberlain, Y.M. 1989. Further records of encrusting coralline algae on the north-east coast of Ireland. Ir. Nat. J. 23: 102 - 106.

Morton, O. 1992 Charophyta. In: Hackney, P. (ed) Stewart and Corry's Flora of the North-East of Ireland. Institute of Irish Studies, Belfast. 419 pp.

Morton, O. 1994. Marine Algae of Northern Ireland. Ulster Museum, Belfast. 

Morton, O. 2003. The marine macroalgae of Co. Donegal, Ireland. Bull. Ir. biogeog. Soc. No. 27: 3 - 164

 Marine Algae of Northern Ireland

References 

1945 births
Alumni of Trinity College Dublin
Alumni of the University of Wales
20th-century Irish botanists
20th-century British botanists
Living people
British marine biologists
Phycologists